Adrien Greslon (1618 at Périgueux – 1697) was a French Jesuit missionary to China.

Life

He entered the Society of Jesus at Bordeaux, 5 November 1635. He then taught literature and theology in various houses of his order until 1655, when he was sent as a missionary to China. 

He arrived there in 1657, and after mastering the Chinese and Manchu languages went to the Province of Jiangxi, which he described as a veritable Garden of Eden. Here he remained, engaged in his missionary labours, until 1670, when he returned to France.

Works

Greslon wrote two books: Les vies des saints patriarches de l'Ancien Testament, with reflections in Chinese; and Histoire de la Chine sous la domination des Tartares ... depuis l'année 16 ... jusqu'en 1669 (Paris, 1671).

References

Attribution
 The entry cites:
Moreri, Grand Dictionaire historique

1618 births
1697 deaths
17th-century French Jesuits
French Roman Catholic missionaries
History of Jiangxi
French sinologists
Jesuit missionaries in China
French expatriates in China